Mandinga Airport  is an airport serving the platinum mining town of Condoto in the Chocó Department of Colombia.

The  Condoto non-directional beacon (Ident: CDT) is located on the field.

See also

Transport in Colombia
List of airports in Colombia

References

External links
OpenStreetMap - Mandinga
OurAirports - Mandinga
SkyVector - Mandinga
FallingRain - Mandinga Airport

Airports in Colombia